Sebastian Karlsson (born September 19, 1986 in Gothenburg, Sweden) is a professional Swedish ice hockey player. He is currently playing for Linköpings HC of the Swedish Swedish Hockey League (SHL).

Playing career
On November 5, 2011, Sebastian Karlsson hit former Frölunda HC teammate Magnus Kahnberg to the head in an away game between Karlsson's Linköping and Kahnberg's Frölunda. The hit resulted in Kahnberg being hospitalised with a severe concussion, a deep forehead laceration, and several teeth knocked out. Karlsson received a match penalty, and was suspended for 11 Elitserien games, which was at the time the 2011–12 Elitserien season's longest suspension as well as the third longest suspension in the Elitserien history. He also missed the entire 2011 European Trophy playoffs as a result, because Elitserien suspensions also cover ice hockey in general and thus are not limited to the Elitserien league (the suspension expires after December 20, 2011).

Personal
Karlsson is the younger brother of fellow professional ice hockey player, Jens Karlsson.

References

External links

1986 births
Brynäs IF players
Frölunda HC players
Linköping HC players
Living people
Nybro Vikings players
Rögle BK players
Swedish ice hockey forwards
Ice hockey people from Gothenburg